Ramon Tribulietx Santolaya (born 20 September 1972) is a Spanish football coach and former player.

Tribulietx holds the world record for the most trophies in continental competitions, winning seven straight OFC Champions League titles with Auckland City between 2011 and 2017.

Playing career
Born in Barcelona, Tribulietx enjoyed a low-profile playing career in New Zealand, signing for would-be North Island Soccer League champions Central United in 1999. However, he stayed for only two months before breaking his arm in a reserve fixture and returning to Spain.

He came briefly out of retirement while manager of Auckland City in 2014, playing several games for Northern League Division Two side Warkworth AFC in 2014 under current Wellington Phoenix goalkeeping coach Paul Gothard.

Coaching career
Having gained a degree in physical education at the Institut Nacional d'Educació Física de Catalunya in 1998, Tribulietx's first foray into management came as the assistant coach of newly promoted Segunda División B side UE Sant Andreu. The next season, Tribulietx moved to UE Figueres at the same level and, after the club's dissolution, moved to UE Castelldefels.

Tribulietx became the assistant manager at Auckland City under Paul Posa in 2008. In 2010, he was named as co-manager of Auckland City along with Aaron McFarland; Tribulietx took full control of the club following the 2010–11 season, and has remained at the club since, topping the league in six out of his eight seasons and winning the playoff series three times.

Tribulietx won seven consecutive OFC Champions League titles between 2011 and 2017, the highest consecutive streak of any manager for any continental or international competition. As a result, Auckland City has qualified for seven consecutive Club World Cup competitions. Tribulietx guided the Navy Blues to a historic third-placed finish in the 2014 FIFA Club World Cup, falling to Copa Libertadores champions San Lorenzo in extra time in the semi-final before defeating Cruz Azul in a penalty shootout in the third-placed playoff.

In addition to his management duties at Auckland City, Tribulietx has also enjoyed external coaching roles, acting as technical advisor for the Canada women's national football team at the 2012 Summer Olympics (winning an eventual bronze medal), and for the Solomon Islands national football team during the 2016 OFC Nations Cup.

On 10 December 2021, he was hired by FC Akron Tolyatti in the Russian second-tier Russian Football National League. He left Akron on 2 March 2022 due to the Russian invasion of Ukraine.

Honours

Manager 
Auckland City FC
 FIFA Club World Cup third place: 2014
 OFC Champions League (7): 2010–11, 2011–12, 2012–13, 2013–14, 2014-15, 2016, 2017
 New Zealand Football Championship Premiers (6): 2011-12, 2013-14, 2014-15, 2015–16, 2016–17, 2017–18
 New Zealand Football Championship: 2014, 2015, 2018
 Charity Cup: 2011, 2013, 2015, 2016, 2018
 OFC President's Cup: 2014
 Lunar New Year Cup: 2017

Technical consultant
Canada Women's Olympic Team
 2012 London Olympics third place: 2012

References

External links

1972 births
Living people
People from Barcelona
Spanish footballers
Spanish football managers
Auckland City FC managers
Russian First League managers
Spanish expatriate football managers
Expatriate association football managers in New Zealand
Expatriate football managers in the Solomon Islands
Expatriate football managers in Russia
Spanish expatriate sportspeople in New Zealand
Spanish expatriate sportspeople in the Solomon Islands
Spanish expatriate sportspeople in Russia
Association footballers not categorized by position